Philippe Rei Ryu Coupey,  born in New York City, is a Zen monk in the Sōtō line of Taisen Deshimaru.

Biography 
Coupey left the U.S. for France in 1968. In 1972, he met Master Deshimaru in Paris and soon after began working on his transcriptions and teachings.

Coupey works and teaches within the International Zen Association (Association Zen Internationale or A.Z.I.)

Bibliography

In English 
 In the Belly of the Dragon (Vol. 1 et 2), A Zen Monk s Commentary on the Shinjinmei by Master Sosan, Hohm Press, Arizona, 2020 (ISBN 978-1942493532)
The Song of the Wind in the Dry Tree: Commentaries on Dogen's Sansho Doei and Koun Ejo's Komyozo Zanmei, Hohm Press, Arizona, 2014, (110 pages)
Zen, Simply Sitting: the Fukanzazengi by Master Dogen, Hohm Press, Arizona, 2007. (120 pages)
In the Belly of the Dragon, vol. 1: the Shinjinmei by Master Sosan, American Zen Association, New Orleans, 2005. (202 pages)

In French 
 Fragments Zen - Mémoires de chair, Éditions l’Originel-Antoni, Paris, 2021, 96 pages, (ISBN 979-10-91413-88-6)
 Les 10 taureaux du zen, Sauvagerie Productions, 2020
Zen d'aujourd'hui, Éditions le Relié, Paris, 2014, 209 pages,
Le chant du vent dans l'arbre sec, 12 poèmes du Sansho Doei du Maître Dogen et le Komyozo Zanmai de son disciple et successeur Koun Ejo, Editions l'Originel, Paris, 2011, 157 pages, 
Zen simple assise, le Fukanzazengi du Maître Dogen, Adverbum, Editions Désiris, 2009,120 pages, 
Mon corps de lune, quarante-six poèmes de l'Eiheikoroku du maître Dogen, Adeverbum, Editions Désiris, Paris, 2007, 238 pages, 
Dans le ventre du Dragon Vol.1, le Shinjinmei du Maître Sosan, Editions Deux versants, Paris, 2002, 283 pages,

In German 
 Tun und Lassen - Zen und das Entdecken des Wirklichen (Kommentar zum Fukanzazenghi von Meister Dōgen) – Kristkeitz-Verlag, Heidelberg, 2020, (ISBN 978-3-948378-07-3)
San Do kai. (Kommentar zum Sandokai von Meister Sekito) Shin Edition, Bremen 2005, (ISBN 3-933995-16-7)

Books by Taisen Deshimaru, edited by Philippe Coupey 
Zen and Karma (revised edition of The Voice of the Valley), Hohm Press, Chino Valley, Arizona ( 202 pages )
Zen & Budo (bilingual book English/French) - Editions Budo, Paris 2014, (157 pages)
Sit, Hohm Press, Arizona, 1996. (375 pages)
The Voice of the Valley, Bobbs-Merrill, Indiana, 1979. (226 pages)

Fiction under the pseudonym of MC Dalley 
 Horse Medicine - American Zen Association, New Orleans, 2002, (235 pages )
 Temple Rapidly Vanishing - Deux Versants Editeur, Romeyer (France), 2012, (460 pages )

See also 
 Buddhism in France

References

External links 
 Zen Road, official website of the Sangha Sans Demeure, an international group of friends and disciples of the monk Philippe Rei Ryu Coupey
 Paris Zen Dojo, founded by Master Deshimaru
 Seine Zen Dojo, Paris, founded by Philippe Coupey
 International Zen Association founded by Master Deshimaru
 IZAUK, the International Zen Association UK
 Zen in Northern Germany, network of North German Zen dojos
 American Zen Association

Year of birth missing (living people)
Living people
Religious leaders from New York City
American Zen Buddhists
American Buddhist monks